Neoitamus cothurnatus, the scarce awl robberfly, is a species of 'robber fly' belonging to the family Asilidae.

Distribution
This species is present in Europe.

Description 
Males have tergite 6 predominantly tomentose, only shiny dorsally; epandria is short, more or less square. In females sternite 7 shows tomentose longitudinal stripes.

This species is rather similar to Neoitamus cyanurus. The latter shows more elongate and almost totally black hind basitarsi, that are mostly red in Neiotamus cothurnatus.

Biology
These robberflies fly from end of May to middle of August.

References

External links

Grim Robberflies of Germany
Images representing Neoitamus cothurnatus

Asilidae
Insects described in 1820
Brachyceran flies of Europe